Bartolomeo Cartolario (died November 1614) was a Roman Catholic prelate who served as Bishop of Chioggia (1613–1614).

Biography
On 11 February 1613, Bartolomeo Cartolario was appointed during the papacy of Pope Paul V as Bishop of Chioggia.
On 17 February 1613, he was consecrated bishop by Giovanni Delfino, Cardinal-Priest of San Marco; with Ludovico Sarego, Bishop of Adria, and Coriolani Garzadoro, Bishop of Ossero, serving as co-consecrators. 
He served as Bishop of Chioggia until his death in November 1614.

References

External links and additional sources
 (for Chronology of Bishops) 
 (for Chronology of Bishops) 

17th-century Italian Roman Catholic bishops
Bishops appointed by Pope Paul V
1614 deaths